In linguistic typology, object–subject–verb (OSV) or object–agent–verb (OAV) is a classification of languages, based  on whether the structure predominates in pragmatically neutral expressions.
An example of this would be "Oranges Sam ate."

Unmarked word order

Natural languages
OSV is rarely used in unmarked sentences, which use a normal word order without emphasis. Most languages that use OSV as their default word order come from the Amazon basin, such as Xavante, Jamamadi, Apurinã, Warao, Kayabí and Nadëb. Here is an example from Apurinã:

British Sign Language (BSL) normally uses topic–comment structure, but its default word order when topic–comment structure is not used is OSV.

Marked word order

Various languages allow OSV word order but only in marked sentences, which emphasise part or all of the sentence.

Arabic
Classical Arabic is generally VSO but allows OSV in marked sentences (ones using traditional Arabic declension). For example, Verse 5 of Al-Fatiha reads:

The construction is less used in Modern Standard Arabic, which tends not to use marked sentences, and is generally absent in the colloquial varieties of Arabic, which are generally not declined and tend to observe strict SVO order.

Chinese
Passive constructions in Chinese follow an OSV (OAV) pattern through the use of the particle 被:

Finnish
Finnish has a remarkably lax word order and so emphasis on the object is often marked simply by putting it first in the sentence. An example would be "Sinua minä rakastan!", which word by word would be in English "you I love!" and which expresses a contrast to maybe loving someone else. This word order is totally natural and quite often used for emphasis. Another example would be "Suklaata se kyllä suostuu syömään", or word by word "Chocolate he/she/they(sg.) instead consents to-eat", which expresses the contrast of refusing to eat something else (like something more healthy).

Hebrew
In Modern Hebrew, OSV is often used instead of the normal SVO to emphasise the object. אני אוהב אותה would mean "I love her", but "אותה אני אוהב" would mean "It is she whom I love". Possibly an influence of Germanic (via Yiddish), as Jewish English uses a similar construction ("You, I like, kid") much more than many other varieties of English and often with the "it is" left implicit.

Hungarian
In Hungarian, OSV emphasises the subject:

A szócikket én szerkesztettem = The article/I/edited (It was I, not somebody else, who edited the article).

Korean and Japanese 
Korean and Japanese have SOV by default, but since they are topic-prominent languages, they often seem to be OSV when the object is topicalized. Here is an example in Korean:

An almost identical syntax is possible in Japanese:

Malayalam
OSV is one of the permissible word orders in Malayalam, the other being SOV.

Nahuatl
OSV emphasizes the object in Nahuatl.

Portuguese 
OSV is possible in Portuguese to emphasize the object.

Turkish 
OSV is used in Turkish to emphasize the subject:

See also 
Subject–object–verb
Subject–verb–object
Object–verb–subject
Verb–object–subject
Verb–subject–object
Yoda, a popular Star Wars character who speaks in a rare object–subject–verb order
Yoda conditions - a style of writing conditionals in computer programming languages

References 

 
Word order